Namak Rudbar (also Romanized as Namak Rūdbār) is a village in Malfejan Rural District, in the Central District of Siahkal County, Gilan Province, Iran. At the 2006 census, its population was 384, in 103 families.

References 

Populated places in Siahkal County